Methodist Episcopal Church, often called the Little Stone Church, is a historic church in Ottawa, Minnesota, United States.  It was one of the three oldest German Methodist congregations in Minnesota and was built in 1859 in locally quarried pink stone.  The building closed in 1952, but was acquired by the LeSueur County Historical Society in 1967 and now houses artifacts.

It was listed on the National Register of Historic Places in 1982.

References

Buildings and structures in Le Sueur County, Minnesota
Churches completed in 1859
Churches on the National Register of Historic Places in Minnesota
German-American culture in Minnesota
Methodist churches in Minnesota
National Register of Historic Places in Le Sueur County, Minnesota